Derek Robinson may refer to:

Derek Robinson (novelist) (born 1932), British novelist
Derek Robinson (trade unionist) (1927–2017), known as "Red Robbo," British trade union spokesman
Derek Robinson (physicist) (1941–2002), fusion scientist and director of the Culham Science Center
Derek Robinson (sport shooter) (born 1931), British Olympic shooter
Derek W. Robinson (1935–2021), British-Australian theoretical mathematician and physicist